Grigore Nandriș (born January 17, 1895, Mahala, Austro-Hungarian Empire - d. March 2, 1968, Kew, United Kingdom) was a Romanian linguist, philologist and memorialist, professor at Chernivtsi, Kraków and Oxford.

References

External links
 http://www.hotnews.ro/stiri-diaspora-7658525-video-nandris-destinul-unei-familii-tarani-romani-20-ani-siberia-efectul-diaspora.htm
 https://archive.org/details/ColloquialRumanianByGrigoreNandris.GrammarExercisesReaderVocabulary.A
 https://www.google.de/search?hl=ro&tbo=p&tbm=bks&q=inauthor:%22Grigore+Nandri%C5%9F%22&gws_rd=cr&ei=y4WaWafyA4KNUczvgeAF
 https://audiovis.nac.gov.pl/obraz/90756/
 http://bojariu.tripod.com/nandris.htm

People from Chernivtsi Oblast
Romanian philologists
1895 births
1968 deaths
20th-century philologists
Romanian emigrants to the United Kingdom